Zamor (Louis-Benoit, 1762?–1820) was a French revolutionary of Bengali origin.

Zamor may also refer to:

 Guillermo Zamor Colombian and French artist, writer, historian, and philosopher
Geff Zamor, film director for the 2007 indie film On the Job Training
 Oreste Zamor (1861–1915), president of Haiti from February to October 1914
Emmanuel Zamor (1840-1919), peintre et musicien français d'origine brésilienne ;

See also